(born in December 1971) is a Japanese basketball coach. He originates from Oshima Island. As of 2011 Hamaguchi had been a part of the Japanese basketball league longer than most of the other coaches of Japanese basketball teams had been a part. Ed Odeven of The Japan Times said that Hamaguchi works for success but does not seek attention despite being in a social media era.

For six seasons of the existence of the Sendai 89ers, Hamaguchi served as the coach. He began as the coach of the Sendai 89ers after the team entered the bj-league in 2005. In 2011 Hamaguchi's coaching of the Sendai 89ers ended after the 2011 Tōhoku earthquake and tsunami occurred. He is now the coach of the Kyoto Hannaryz.

Ed Odeven said that Hamaguchi has "quirks" and sometimes an "overbearing coaching style." In regards to Marcus Cousin playing for the Kyoto team, in 2012 a former Hannaryz player asked "He should obviously dominate, but it is all about how his personality will deal with Honoo. Will Honoo let him be himself, or will Honoo try to control every little detail?"

Head coaching record

|- 
| style="text-align:left;"|Sendai 89ers
| style="text-align:left;"|2005-06
| 40||18||22|||| style="text-align:center;"|4th|||-||-||-||
| style="text-align:center;"|
|-
| style="text-align:left;"|Sendai 89ers
| style="text-align:left;"|2006-07
| 40||19||21|||| style="text-align:center;"|5th|||-||-||-||
| style="text-align:center;"|
|-
| style="text-align:left;"|Sendai 89ers
| style="text-align:left;"|2007-08
| 44||29||15|||| style="text-align:center;"|1st in Eastern|||2||1||1||
| style="text-align:center;"|3rd place
|-
| style="text-align:left;"|Sendai 89ers
| style="text-align:left;"|2008-09
| 52||31||21|||| style="text-align:center;"|3rd in Eastern|||2||0||2||
| style="text-align:center;"|Lost in 1st round
|-
| style="text-align:left;"|Sendai 89ers
| style="text-align:left;"|2009-10
| 52||35||17|||| style="text-align:center;"|2nd in Eastern|||3||1||2||
| style="text-align:center;"|Lost in 1st round
|-
| style="text-align:left;"|Sendai 89ers
| style="text-align:left;"|2010-11
| 36||24||12|||| style="text-align:center;"|-|||-||-||-||
| style="text-align:center;"|
|-
| style="text-align:left;"|Kyoto Hannaryz
| style="text-align:left;"|2011-12
| 52||34||18|||| style="text-align:center;"|3rd in Western|||8||4||4||
| style="text-align:center;"|4th place
|-
| style="text-align:left;"|Kyoto Hannaryz
| style="text-align:left;"|2012-13
| 52||29||23|||| style="text-align:center;"|5th in Western|||7||5||2||
| style="text-align:center;"|3rd place
|-
| style="text-align:left;"|Kyoto Hannaryz
| style="text-align:left;"|2013-14
| 52||34||18|||| style="text-align:center;"|2nd in Western|||5||2||3||
| style="text-align:center;"|4th place
|-
| style="text-align:left;"|Kyoto Hannaryz
| style="text-align:left;"|2014-15
| 52||44||8|||| style="text-align:center;"|1st in Western|||5||3||2||
| style="text-align:center;"|Lost in 2nd round
|-
| style="text-align:left;"|Kyoto Hannaryz
| style="text-align:left;"|2015-16
| 52||41||11|||| style="text-align:center;"|1st in Western|||6||4||2||
| style="text-align:center;"|4th place
|-
| style="text-align:left;"|Kyoto Hannaryz
| style="text-align:left;"|2016-17
| 60||26||34|||| style="text-align:center;"|4th in Western|||-||-||-||
| style="text-align:center;"|-
|-
| style="text-align:left;"|Kyoto Hannaryz
| style="text-align:left;"|2017-18
| 60||34||26|||| style="text-align:center;"|2nd in Western|||2||0||2||
| style="text-align:center;"|Lost in 1st round
|-
| style="text-align:left;"|Kyoto Hannaryz
| style="text-align:left;"|2018-19
| 60||31||29|||| style="text-align:center;"|3rd in Western|||-||-||-||
| style="text-align:center;"|-
|-
| style="text-align:left;"|Kyoto Hannaryz
| style="text-align:left;"|2019-20
| 41||20||21|||| style="text-align:center;"|4th in Western|||-||-||-||
| style="text-align:center;"|-
|-

References

Living people
Japanese basketball coaches
People from Tokyo
1971 births
Kyoto Hannaryz coaches
Sendai 89ers coaches
Aichi Gakusen University alumni